|}

The Arkle Novice Chase is a Grade 1 National Hunt steeplechase in Ireland which is open to horses aged five years or older. It is run at Leopardstown over a distance of about 2 miles and 1 furlong (3,420 metres), and during its running there are eleven fences to be jumped. The race is for novice chasers, and it is scheduled to take place each year in late January.

The earliest version of the event was established in 1956, and it was originally contested over 2 miles (3,219 metres). Its current title pays tribute to Arkle, a winner of this race in 1963. At the time of Arkle's victory the event was known as the Milltown Novice Chase. The distance was extended by 2 furlongs in 1980, and by another furlong in 1992. It was cut to its present length in 1995.

The race is sometimes referred to as the "Irish Arkle", as there is a different event, similar in both name and format, which takes place in Great Britain in March. Several winners of the Irish version have subsequently achieved victory in its British counterpart, the Arkle Challenge Trophy. The most recent of these is El Fabiolo in 2023.

Records
<div style="font-size:90%">

Leading jockey since 1956 (4 wins):
 Frank Berry -  Spanish Tan (1975), Siberian Sun (1977), Bobsline (1984), Barrow Line (1987)

Leading trainer since 1956 (9 wins):
 Willie Mullins -  Assessed (2002), Missed That (2006), Golden Silver (2009), Un de Sceaux (2015), Douvan (2016), Footpad (2018), Energumene (2021), Blue Lord (2022), El Fabiolo (2023)</div>

Winners

See also
 Horse racing in Ireland
 List of Irish National Hunt races

References
 Racing Post:

 pedigreequery.com – Arkle Perpetual Challenge Cup Novice Chase – Leopardstown''.

National Hunt races in Ireland
National Hunt chases
Leopardstown Racecourse
Recurring sporting events established in 1956
1956 establishments in Ireland